On 21 November 1979, Pakistani people, enraged by a radio report claiming that the United States had bombed the Masjid al-Haram, Islam's holy site at Mecca, stormed the U.S. embassy in Islamabad, and burned it to the ground. The Grand Mosque had suffered a terrorist attack, but the U.S. was not involved. The U.S. diplomats survived by hiding in a reinforced area. Marine Security Guard Corporal Steven Crowley, 20, Army warrant officer Bryan Ellis, 29, and two Pakistani staff members were killed in the attack.

Events 
Islamism started to become popular in Pakistan after Saudi Arabia, which had a state religion of Wahhabism, began sponsoring religious endowments in the country. In 1977 Army Chief of Staff Muhammad Zia-ul-Haq overthrew and executed the secular Prime Minister Zulfikar Ali Bhutto in a 1977 coup d'état and began implementing Islamic law.

On 20 November 1979, a Saudi Arabian Islamic zealot group led a takeover of the Mosque in Mecca. The group's demands included calling for the cutoff of oil exports to the United States and the expulsion of all foreign civilian and military experts from the Arabian Peninsula.  However, there was confusion over who had perpetrated the attack, and Iran's Supreme Leader Ayatollah Khomeini accused the United States and Israel. This claim was repeated in media reports the morning of 21 November. It was fueled by Voice of America reports that President Jimmy Carter had sent U.S. Navy aircraft carriers to the Indian Ocean in response to the ongoing Iran hostage crisis.

The seizure was mostly planned by students at Quaid-i-Azam University, where the Islamist party Jamaat-e-Islami had recently won elections for the student body. The protesters shouted anti-American slogans. At first glance the event seemed to be a small protest outside the embassy's walls.  Later, buses filled with Jamaat-i-Islami supporters arrived at the main gate. Hundreds of people began climbing over the walls and trying to pull the walls down using ropes. According to the staff at the neighboring British Embassy there were as many as 1,500 demonstrators.

Pakistani police tried to disperse the protesters by firing into them. According to reports, two protesters were killed and 70 injured.

According to an American investigation, the protesters, believing that an American Marine on the roof of the embassy had fired first, opened fire after a bullet fired at the gate's lock by one rioter ricocheted and struck other protesters. Twenty-year-old Marine Corporal Steve Crowley was mortally wounded by a bullet and transported to the embassy's secure communication vault along with the rest of personnel serving in the embassy, including undercover CIA officer Gary Schroen. The rioters breached the compound and set fire to the lower floors of the chancery with Molotov cocktails. Although the Marines used tear gas against the protestors, embassy officials denied them permission to use lethal force. Several American civilians were taken hostage in the embassy residences by the rioters, while U.S. Army warrant officer Brian Ellis was killed. The rioters intended to take these hostages back to campus for a sham trial for espionage, but they were rescued by Pakistani police.

Pakistani soldiers rescued nearly 100 people who were trapped in the embassy vault for five hours. The vault had access to the roof. Pakistani forces landed helicopters on the roof, pushed back the protesters and rescued the US embassy staff.

Locked behind steel-reinforced doors the Americans waited for help to come and rescue them from the smoke-filled building. During the wait the rioters attempted to break in and shot at them through the ventilation shafts. After nightfall a Marine unit was able to sneak out a back exit from the vault as the front door was too damaged to open.  Finding the embassy empty they led the rest of the 140 people from the vault out into the courtyard.

After the attack, nonessential embassy personnel were evacuated back to the United States. Ayatollah Khomeini praised the attack, while Zia-ul-Haq condemned it in a televised address, stating "I understand that the anger and grief over this incident were quite natural, but the way in which they were expressed is not in keeping with the lofty Islamic traditions of discipline and forbearance."

In media

A detailed narrative of this event is provided in the book Ghost Wars: The Secret History of the CIA, Afghanistan, and Bin Laden, from the Soviet Invasion to September 10, 2001 by Steve Coll.

See also
2012 Benghazi attack on U.S Consulate
United States Embassy siege in Tehran
1983 Beirut barracks bombing
Anti-Americanism
Pakistan–United States relations
Attacks on U.S consulate in Karachi
Grand Mosque seizure

Bibliography
Notes

References 

 - Total pages: 736 
 - Total pages: 469 

Arson in Pakistan
Pakistan–United States relations

Events in Islamabad
Us Embassy Burning In Islamabad, 1979
United States Marine Corps in the 20th century
Sieges involving Pakistan
Buildings and structures in Pakistan destroyed by arson
Military government of Pakistan (1977–1988)
Attacks on diplomatic missions of the United States
United States
20th century in Islamabad
Crime in Islamabad
US Emb